Poothura, is a place near Anjengo and Chirayinkeezhu in the coastal area in the Thiruvananthapuram District of Kerala.

References

Tourism in Kerala
Populated coastal places in India
Villages in Thiruvananthapuram district